The 124th Division was a division of the PRC People's Liberation Army. During the Korean War, it was the first unit of the People's Republic of China to cross the Yalu River.

History
The 124th Division was a military formation of the People's Volunteer Army (Chinese People's Volunteers (CPV) or Chinese Communist Forces (CCF)) during the Korean War with a standard strength of approximately 10,000 men. It was a component of the 42nd Army, consisting of the 370th, 371st, and 372nd Regiments.

While the 124th Division at first drove back the ROK troops it encountered, and then slowed the advance of the U.S. Marine troops that replaced them on the road to the reservoir, UNC intelligence indicated that it did not have the success that attended the CCF action against the ROK II Corps and part of the U.S. I Corps in the west. The 124th Division faced the 1st Marine Division at Sudong on November 2. However, 124th division and other units of 42nd corps were relieved by 20th corps on November 10, and attended battle of Chongchon River. This division and 125th division defeated ROK 8th division on November 26, then 125th was deployed as van guard, and 124th division was its reinforce.

Current
In April 2017, The division was divided into two brigades: the 124th Amphibious Combined Arms Brigade and the 125th Amphibious Combined Arms Brigade. The 124th is transferred to the PLA 72nd Group Army (formerly 1st Group Army) under the Eastern Theater Command; the 125th is still part of the PLA 42nd Group Army, which is currently known as the 74th Group Army, under the Southern Theater Command.

It is now an amphibious mechanised unit.

References

Infantry divisions of the People's Volunteer Army
124